Brendan McCaul is an Irish film producer and distributor.  He won a Career Achievement Award at the 2007 Jameson Dublin International Film Festival.

References

External links
Twitter page
IMDb page

Irish film producers
Living people
Year of birth missing (living people)